Li Enliang (or E.L.li) (1912–2008) was a Chinese civil engineer and educator. Li was a former Vice-president of Zhejiang University and former President of the Zhejiang University of Technology.

Life

Li was born in Xinning (新宁, current Taishan: 台山), Guangdong Province in 1912. Li received BEng in civil engineering from Zhijiang University (之江大学, also known as Hangchow University, which later was merged into Zhejiang University) in Hangzhou, Zhejiang Province.

Li did his further studies in the United States. Li obtained MSc from the University of Michigan in Ann Arbor in 1939. In 1941 Li obtained PhD from Cornell University.

Li went back to China after his study in the US, and was promoted to associate professor at Zhejiang University in Hangzhou, and professor at Fudan University in Shanghai.

After 1949, Li was professor of civil engineering at Zhijiang University before the university was dissociated and merged into Zhejiang University. Li was transferred to professor of Zhejiang University, and was the Chair of its Department of Civil Engineering. Li was former Vice-president of Zhejiang University.

Li was the President of Hangzhou Institute of Engineering. In Dec 1981, Li was pointed the President of the Zhejiang University of Technology, till Dec 1983.

Li died in Hangzhou on 28 July 2008, at age of 96.

References

External links
 Zhejiang University Archive: Memory of Hangchow University and the construction of Zhejiang University new campus (30 Apr 2007 reviewed)
 The golden old days of Zhejiang University

1912 births
2008 deaths
People from Taishan, Guangdong
Chinese civil engineers
Zhejiang University alumni
University of Michigan alumni
Cornell University alumni
Academic staff of Zhejiang University
Presidents of Zhejiang University of Technology
Educators from Guangdong
Engineers from Guangdong